Linn Mesa is a small mesa located  south of the Chisholm Hills in the Southern Cross Mountains of Victoria Land, Antarctica. It was mapped by the United States Geological Survey from surveys and U.S. Navy air photos, 1960–64, and was named by the Advisory Committee on Antarctic Names for Paul E. Linn, U.S. Navy, a utilitiesman at McMurdo Station in 1963 and 1967.

References

Mesas of Antarctica
Landforms of Victoria Land
Borchgrevink Coast